Keith Martin  BM BCh DM MRCP FRCOphth ALCM is an ophthalmologist.

He is the inaugural Professor of Ophthalmology at the University of Cambridge and a specialist in the treatment of glaucoma. In 2013, Professor Martin's team tested a novel technique of bio-printing, using an ink jet to recreate layers of ganglion and glial cells from a rat's retina, a process that has been described as 'printing eyeballs'.

Early life and education
Martin was educated at The Royal School, Armagh, from 1980 to 1987, and was head boy in his final year. He then won a place at St Catharine's College, Cambridge to read medical science and neuroscience. He graduated with first class honours in three subjects.

He qualified as a medical doctor at Oxford University in 1993. He then did medical research at several institutions in the USA and UK including: the UCL Institute of Ophthalmology, Moorfields Eye Hospital and the Wilmer Eye Institute.

Career
He has specialised in the treatment of glaucoma and in 2005 he established the Glaucoma Research Laboratory at Cambridge. He is also an editor of the Journal of Glaucoma and treasurer of the World Glaucoma Association.

In 2009 he became Cambridge University's Professor of Ophthalmology. This was a new chair, sponsored by the Cambridge Eye Trust. 
In 2013, he worked with Dr Barbara Lorber and others on the use of a piezoelectric inkjet nozzle to spray ganglion and glial cells from a rat retina. The cells survived the process of deposition in layers and continued to grow in culture.  With further development and testing, techniques like this could have clinical application for the repair of damaged retinas.

Family life
Keith Martin is married and has three children. He lives in Melbourne. His wife, Susie, is better known as Dr. Susan Harden, the thoracic oncologist and Lead Clinician in Lung Cancer at Addenbrooke Hospital before moving to Australia in late 2019
.

Honours and awards
2010: ARVO  Pfizer Ophthalmics Carl Camras Translational Research (TR) Award, or 'ARVO Camras Award for TR'. This is an award for young researchers with innovative work that shows potential for clinical application.

Publications

See also
Carl B. Camras
Robert MacLaren
Stephen Tsang

References

External links
profile at the Department of Clinical Neurosciences

 

Living people
20th-century births
Year of birth missing (living people)
Alumni of St Catharine's College, Cambridge
Alumni of the University of Oxford
Academics of the University of Cambridge
British ophthalmologists